Almon Woodworth (April 1841 – October 5, 1908) was an American politician in the state of Washington. He served in the Washington House of Representatives from 1893 to 1897.

References

1841 births
1908 deaths
Republican Party members of the Washington House of Representatives
People from Union County, Pennsylvania
19th-century American politicians